Phenylacetylcarbinol (PAC) is an organic compound that has two enantiomers, one with R- and one with S-configuration. (R)-PAC, which is commonly called -PAC, is known as a precursor in the synthesis of pharmaceuticals such as ephedrine and pseudoephedrine.

Nomenclature 

(R)-PAC or (R)-(−)-phenylacetylcarbinol is identical to -PAC, referring to the outdated  system.  (R)-PAC is the levo-rotating isomer of phenylacetylcarbinol.

The IUPAC name of phenylacetylcarbinol is 1-hydroxy-1-phenylpropan-2-one. Synonyms are 1-hydroxy-1-phenyl-2-propanone and 1-Hydroxy-1-phenylacetone.

Production
(R)-PAC is widely synthesized by fermentation of benzaldehyde and dextrose. In this process, colonies of yeast (in particular, strains such as Candida utilis, Torulaspora delbrueckii, or Saccharomyces cerevisiae) are cultivated and added to a broth of water, dextrose, and the enzyme pyruvate decarboxylase in a vat.  The yeast is left to grow for a period of time, after which the benzaldehyde is introduced into the broth.  The yeast then ferments the benzaldehyde into (R)-PAC. Boiling point at 12mmHg is 124-125C.

The majority of L-PAC is generated in pharmaceutical plants in India, as an intermediate precursor in the production of pseudoephedrine.

There are also biochemical reactions where enzymes such as acetohydroxyacid synthase I from E. coli condense pyruvate and benzaldehyde into R-PAC. Such methods have much higher conversion rates in comparison to the conventional yeast fermentation.

References

Acyloins
Phenyl compounds